Pablo Roberto dos Santos Barbosa (born 14 November 1999 in São Francisco), or simply Pablo Roberto, is a Brazilian footballer. He currently plays for Remo on loan from Vila Nova.

Honours

Vila Nova
Campeonato Brasileiro Série C: 2020

References

External links
 Pablo Roberto at playmakerstats.com (English version of ogol.com.br)
 

1999 births
Living people
Brazilian footballers
Atlético Clube Goianiense players
Vila Nova Futebol Clube players
Esporte Clube Bahia players
Clube do Remo players
Association football midfielders